Richard Francis (dates unknown) was an English cricketer who played first-class cricket in the last quarter of the 18th century. He played mainly for Hampshire sides although is known to have been born in Surrey and played for Surrey teams before moving to Hampshire. Later he moved to Essex and is known to have played for a variety of sides. He made 47 known appearances in first-class matches between 1773 and 1793.

References

English cricketers
Hampshire cricketers
English cricketers of 1701 to 1786
Hambledon cricketers
Surrey cricketers
Kent cricketers
Year of birth unknown
Year of death unknown
English cricketers of 1787 to 1825
Essex cricketers
Hornchurch Cricket Club cricketers
Non-international England cricketers